Nathaniel "Nano" Short (born 28 January 1985 in London) is an English footballer.

Career

Early life and college
Short grew up in Taunton in the English county of Somerset, with his Mother Donna Morris and Father Martin Short. He attended Ladymead School, and played for English non-league sides Wellington and Bridgwater Town before coming to the United States on a scholarship in 2005.

He played four years of college soccer at Lynn University, earned an All-Sunshine State Conference Honorable Mention honors and a Daktronics First Team All-Region selection as a sophomore, was named the Fighting Knights' Most Valuable Player and to the All-SSC First Team as a junior, and earned All-American honors during his senior year. During his four years as a Fighting Knight he scored 25 career goals and amassed 25 career assists.

During his college career he also played with the Cape Cod Crusaders in the USL Premier Development League. Nathaniel was selected to the Team of the Decade for the Cape Cod Crusaders.

Professional
Short signed his first professional contract in 2009, with the Rochester Rhinos in the USL First Division. He made his professional debut on 18 April 2009, in Rochester's season-opening game against Carolina RailHawks.

Retirement

Honors

Rochester Rhinos
Rochester Rhinos Rookie of the year 2009

USL Team of the Week; Following his goal against MSFC

USSF Division 2 Pro League Regular Season Champions (1): 2010

References

External links
Nano Short at RhinosSoccer.com

1985 births
Living people
English footballers
Wellington A.F.C. players
Bridgwater Town F.C. players
Cape Cod Crusaders players
Rochester New York FC players
GPS Portland Phoenix players
USL First Division players
USSF Division 2 Professional League players
USL League Two players
Lynn Fighting Knights men's soccer players
Association football defenders
English expatriate sportspeople in the United States
Expatriate soccer players in the United States
English expatriate footballers